Cine Mexicano (103A, channel 462) is an American television movie channel which is available to DirecTV customers. It usually offers narco and comedy films, as well as infomercials.

Cine Mexicano's main competitor is Dish Network's Cinelatino.

External links

DirecTV
Movie channels in the United States